Miss Malawi is a national beauty pageant in Malawi. It began in the 1970s in Malawi and was later suspended, commencing again in 2001.

List of Miss Malawi winners (since 2001)

Management
After reviving in 2001 the pageant continued to crown a Miss Malawi until 2012. It was managed by Carver Bhima's company Events Management. Since 2016, the contest has been managed by Nation Publications and Zodiak Broadcasting Station.

Controversies
At the 2012 Miss World, Susan Mtegha pushed Miss New Zealand, Collette Lochore, during the opening headshot of the pageant, claiming that Miss New Zealand was in her space. This action caused a stir throughout the media.

Titleholders represented at Miss World

References

 http://allafrica.com/view/group/main/main/id/00029518.html 
 http://mmalawi.blogspot.com/2008/12/miss-malawi-2009-joyce-mphande.html 
 http://mmalawi.blogspot.com/2008/06/perth-msiska-miss-malawi-information.html

Malawi
Recurring events established in 2001
Beauty pageants in Malawi
Malawian awards